Nika Stanović (born 2 October 1993) is a Croatian volleyball player. She plays as outside hitter for Croatian club ŽOK Kaštela.

References

External links
Nika Stanović at CEV.eu

1993 births
Living people
Croatian women's volleyball players
Sportspeople from Dubrovnik